The sport of soccer (association football) in the United States Virgin Islands is run by the U.S. Virgin Islands Soccer Federation. The association administers the national soccer team, as well as the U.S. Virgin Islands Championship.

League system